The Münch were a Swiss knightly family in the city of Basle and its environs. The first mention of the family dates from 1154; it died out in 1759. In the thirteenth century it was, with the Schaler family, one the most influential families in Basle. From about the end of the fourteenth century members of the family took no further part in the political life of the city.

History 
The earliest mention of the family dates from 1154, when a Münch was in the service of the Prince-Bishop of Basel.

During the thirteenth century members of the family built a number of castles in the country surrounding Basle, and these gave rise to a variety of branches of the family. Some of these were soon extinguished – the Münch of Stettenberg disappeared in 1310, and the Münch of Münchsberg followed them in 1356. The two principal lines were the Münch of Landskron, extinguished in 1460, and the Münch of Münchenstein and of Löwenberg, which died out in 1759.

Until the mid-fourteenth century, members of the Landskron branch appear in political positions in the government of Basle, and three of them became Bürgermeister of the city; from that time on they are seen more often as functionaries of the Habsburg court. Hartung Münch von Landskron was bishop of Basle from 1325 to 1328, and Konrad occupied the same seat from 1393 to 1395. The last of the line was Johans XI, who died in 1460; his brother Burkart VII had died at the Battle of St. Jakob an der Birs in 1444.

The castle of Burg Münchenstein was built between approximately 1260 and 1275 by Hugo III. The Münch von Münchenstein were active in the politics of Basle until about the end of the fourteenth century, but not thereafter.  was bishop of Basle from 1418 until 1422. In the fifteenth century the family ran into financial trouble: Konrad VIII mortgaged Burg Münchenstein in 1470, and in 1526 the lordship of Löwenberg was sold to the Abbey of Lucelle. The Münchenstein branch of the family was extinguished in 1759.

References

Further reading 

 Doris Huggel: Die Münch on Münchenstein - Aufstieg und Niedergang eines Geschlechts, Kulturkommission der Bürgergemeinde Münchenstein 1999.
 Geschichte der Landschaft Basel und des Kantons Basellandschaft, Band 1. Liestal 1932.
 Heimatgeschichtliches Lesebuch von Basel-Stadt, Basel 1942
 Werner Meyer: Burgen von A bis Z, Burgenlexikon der Regio, Basel 1981
 Werner Meyer: "Münchenstein vom Mittelalter bis ins 17. Jahrhundert", in: Münchenstein Heimatkunde, Band 1. Liestal 1995, pages 127–143. .

People from Basel-Stadt
Münchenstein
People of medieval Switzerland